James Franklin Hyneman (born September 25, 1956) is an American special effects expert who is best known as the former co-host of the television series MythBusters alongside Adam Savage, where he became known for his distinctive beret and walrus moustache. He is also the owner of M5 Industries, the special effects workshop where MythBusters was filmed. He is known among Robot Wars devotees for his robot entry Blendo, which was deemed too dangerous for entry in the competition. He is the inventor of the Sentry, an unmanned firefighting robotic vehicle. He is also one of the designers of the aerial cable robotic camera system Wavecam used in sports and entertainment events.

Early life
Hyneman was born in Marshall, Michigan, and grew up on a farm in Columbus, Indiana. He said, "I was a problematic kid, to be sure. I left home when I was 14 and hitchhiked all over the country." As a child, Hyneman would spend time at Indiana University, where his mother was a graduate librarian. Hyneman graduated from Columbus North High School in 1974.

Academic life
He earned a degree in Russian linguistics from Indiana University.

In November 2021, Hyneman was appointed professor of practice at LUT University in Lappeenranta, Finland, for a five-year term until November 2026, and gave his first lecture on prototypes November 18, 2021.

Honorary degrees
He received an honorary Doctor of Engineering degree from Villanova University on May 16, 2010, and gave a commencement address. On November 25, 2011, Hyneman was awarded an honorary doctorate from the University of Twente for his role in the popularization of science and technology. In February 2017 he was named one of the fourteen new honorary doctors of technology by Lappeenranta University of Technology.

Career

Hyneman has worked as a boat captain, certified dive master, wilderness survival expert, linguist, mall pet store owner at age 15, animal wrangler, machinist, concrete inspector, and chef. His most notable work is co-hosting MythBusters (2003–2016).

Special effects work
Much of the experience that Hyneman used on MythBusters came from his time in the visual and special effects professions. He spent time as an animatronics technician for films such as Naked Lunch and Flubber, as well as doing work on the second and third installments of the Matrix Trilogy.

Hyneman owns the special effects company M5 Industries in San Francisco. Some of his achievements in commercials include the can-spitting vending machine seen in 7 Up commercials, and his patented two-wheeled football shoe from Nike Lab commercials.

Other appearances
Hyneman and Adam Savage portray two army-junk sellers in the film The Darwin Awards. They appear during the story of the rocket-car, which they partially reproduced in the MythBusters series' pilot episode and retested twice more.

Hyneman made a cameo appearance along with Savage on CSI: Crime Scene Investigation on the May 1, 2008 episode "The Theory of Everything", where they play inspectors giving thumbs-up after seeing a shirt soaked in pepper spray catch fire when shot by a taser. They tested this myth on MythBusters and declared it confirmed with certain types of pepper spray.

He and Savage appear as judges on the game show Unchained Reaction, which premiered in March 2012. The two also voiced characters on The Simpsons episode "The Daughter Also Rises" as a parody of themselves, the "MythCrackers", which prompts Bart and Milhouse to experiment in a similar fashion. Both Hyneman and Savage also voiced stormtroopers in the Phineas and Ferb Star Wars special.

Relationship with Adam Savage 
In an interview with Helsingin Sanomat on December 2, 2021, Hyneman said that he no longer had any contact with Savage. To the question "would it be an exaggeration to say that you didn't really like him?", Hyneman replied directly:

However, according to Hyneman, the presenters of the program did not have to be friends or even at exactly the same wavelength, saying:

Personal life
In 1984, Hyneman met science teacher Eileen Walsh when he owned a sailboat diving charter business in the Virgin Islands. Hyneman and Walsh married in 1989. Hyneman is a skeptic and an atheist.

References

External links

 
 
 Jamie Hyneman bio from the Discovery Channel

1956 births
American atheists
American skeptics
American television personalities
Indiana University alumni
Living people
People from Marshall, Michigan
People from Columbus, Indiana
Special effects people
Discovery Channel people